Rogo (also Urogo, Burogo, Ucanja Kamuku) is a Kainji language of Nigeria. It is spoken around the town of Ucanja in the Rafi and Mariga Local Government Areas of Niger State, as well as the Birnin Gwari LGA of neighbouring Kaduna State.

The name Rogo can refer to two language varieties, namely a Cinda-Regi variety and another non-Cinda-Regi variety.

References

Kamuku languages
Languages of Nigeria